Mina is a surname.

People bearing the name include:

 Ara Mina, Filipina actress
 Denise Mina, Scottish crime writer
 Francisco Espoz y Mina, Spanish general, uncle of Francisco Javier Mina
 Francisco Javier Mina, Spanish soldier who fought in the Peninsular War and the Mexican War of Independence
 Michael Mina, Egyptian-born American celebrity chef
 Harish Chandra Mina, an Indian MP
 Yerry Mina, Colombian footballer

See also
Minà, surname
Mina (given name)
Mena (surname)